This is a list of Members of Parliament (MPs) elected at the 1906 general election, held over several days from 12 January to 8 February 1906.

MPs

Notes

By-elections

1 November 1906: Galway Borough – Stephen Gwynn (Irish Parliamentary Party) replacing Charles Ramsay Devlin (Irish Parliamentary Party) who resigned, returned to Canada.

31 December 1906: Cork Mid – D. D. Sheehan (Independent Labour) returned unopposed after he was expelled from the Irish Parliamentary Party, resigned his seat and restood on an Independent Labour ticket.

13 April 1907: Westmeath South – Sir Walter Nugent, 4th Baronet (Irish Parliamentary Party) replacing Donal Sullivan (Irish Parliamentary Party) who died 3 March'

20 June 1907: Monaghan North – James Carrige Rushe Lardner (Irish Parliamentary Party) replacing Patrick O'Hare (Irish Parliamentary Party) who resigned on the grounds of ill-health.

21 February 1908: North Leitrim – Francis Meehan (Irish Parliamentary Party) replacing Charles Dolan (Irish Parliamentary Party) who resigned order to re-fight the constituency on behalf of Sinn Féin.

1 May 1909: Cork City – Maurice Healy (Independent Nationalist) replacing William O'Brien (Irish Parliamentary Party) who had resigned.

August 1909: Sligo North – Thomas Scanlan (Irish Parliamentary Party) replacing Patrick Aloysius McHugh (Irish Parliamentary Party).

Sources
Whitaker's Almanack, 1907

See also
UK general election, 1906
List of parliaments of the United Kingdom

1906
 General election
 List
UK MPs